Karan (Qaran) is a rural locality (a selo) in Chekmagushevsky District, Bashkortostan, Russia. The population was 167 as of 2010. There is 1 street.

Geography 
Karan is located 21 km west of Chekmagush (the district's administrative centre) by road. Novobaltachevo is the nearest rural locality.

References 

Rural localities in Chekmagushevsky District